Barbara Delaplace (August 2, 1952 - July 7, 2022) was a Canadian science fiction writer.

She married Jack C. Haldeman II. Delaplace won the Homer Award for best short story of 1992 for her "Black Ice", originally published in the theme anthology Aladdin: Master of the Lamp. She died on July 7, 2022 at the age of 69.

Bibliography

Short stories 
 "Freedom" (1992) (collected in Mike Resnick's alternate history anthology Alternate Kennedys)
 "Standing Firm" (1993) (collected in Mike Resnick's alternate history anthology Alternate Warriors)
 "Painted Bridges" (1994) (collected in Mike Resnick's alternate history anthology Alternate Outlaws)

References

External links 

1952 births
2022 deaths
Canadian science fiction writers
Canadian women novelists
Women science fiction and fantasy writers